Howard Gable is a New Zealand-born Australian record producer who is best known for his work as an A&R manager and house producer for EMI's Columbia pop label in Australia in the late 1960s and early 1970. He was also for some years married to New Zealand born pop/country singer and former Australian 'Queen of Pop' Allison Durbin.

Gable began his career with EMI's HMV label in New Zealand before relocating to Australia ca. 1968. He worked with Durbin from the late 1960s to the mid-1970s and produced most of her successful recordings of the early 1970s. He is best known for his work with John Farnham, producing five studio albums with the Australian singer as well as the Charlie Girl soundtrack of which Farnham was the lead. Other notable productions for EMI Australia in this period include the hit singles "5:10 Man" and "Turn Up Your Radio" by The Masters Apprentices; and "I'll Be Gone", the debut single by progressive rock group Spectrum, which was a number one hit in Australia in 1970.

Discography

Howard Gable

Music Production Credits

1966

The Dallas Four – That Man's Got No Luck

La Gloria Records – GSP084

Vinyl  7" Single

A Side             That Man's Got No Luck (Benson)    2:38

B Side             I'm So Lonely                                     2:35

Credits

·    Recording Engineer – Peter Hitchcock

·    Produced by Howard Gable

·    Recorded at HMV Studios – Wellington, New Zealand

1967

Mr Lee Grant – Mr Lee Grant

Label: His Master's Voice – CSDM6250

Vinyl  LP  Album Stereo

A Side

1          Havah Hagilah (Traditional)

            Musical Director – Garth Young

2          You Can Have Her (Cook)

            Musical Director – Jimmy Sloggett

3          The Real Thing (Armstead, Sanford, Simpson)

            Musical Director – Jimmy Sloggett

4          Some Kind Of Magic (Kornfield, Ross, ReNew Zealandetti)

            Musical Director – Jimmy Sloggett

5          Coloured Lights (Mason, Reed )

            Musical Director – Jimmy Sloggett

6          Opportunity (Marascalco, Harvshman, Joyner )

            Musical Director – Garth Young

B Side.

1          Yo Yo ( J. South)

            Musical Director – Jimmy Sloggett

2          Take My Hand ( Dick Addrissi-Don Addrisi)

            Musical Director – Garth Young

3          Love ( Art Christopher Jnr, R. Bernard)

            Musical Director – Garth Young

4          The Coalman ( B M & R Gibb)

            Musical Director – Jimmy Sloggett

5.         Spicks And Specks  (B. Gibb)

            Musical Director – Garth Young

6.         Thanks To You  (Van Dyke)

            Musical Director – Jimmy Sloggett

Credits

·    Design – Peter Burge

·    Liner Notes – Pete Sinclair

·    Photography – Sal Criscillo

·    Recording Engineer – Peter Hitchcock

·    Produced by Howard Gable

·    Recorded at HMV Studios – Wellington, New Zealand

Tom Thumb  – Whatcha Gonna Do About It

Label: La Gloria Records – GSP085

Vinyl 7" 45 RPM Single

A Side             Whatcha Gonna Do About It (Samwell Marriott Lane)        2:26

B Side             You're Gonna Miss Me (Rocky Erikson)                               2:05

Credits

·    Recording Engineer – Peter Hitchcock

·    Produced by Howard Gable

·    Recorded at HMV Studios – Wellington, New Zealand

Mr Lee Grant – Thanks To You

Label: His Master's Voice – HR296

Vinyl 7" Single

A Side             Thanks To You  (Van Dyke)

B Side                         The Real Thing (Armstead, Sanford, Simpson)

Credits

·    Arranged by – Jimmy Sloggett

·    Recording Engineer – Peter Hitchcock

·    Produced by Howard Gable

·    Recorded at HMV Studios – Wellington, New Zealand

 1968

 The Simple Image – Spinning, Spinning, Spinning

Label: His Master's Voice – HR315

Vinyl 7" Single

A Side             Spinning, Spinning, Spinning (Boetteher, Friedman)

B Side             Shy Boy (Hopkins, Burgess)

Credits

·    Recording Engineer – Peter Hitchcock

·    Produced by Howard Gable

·    Recorded at HMV Studios – Wellington, New Zealand

The Simple Image – Spinning, Spinning, Spinning

Label: Regal – SREG30042

Vinyl LP Stereo

A Side

1          Spinning, Spinning, Spinning (Boettecher, Friedman)

2          Love Of The Common People (J. Hurley, R. Wilkins)

3          Hold Me Tight (Johnny Nash)

4          I Don't Want To Love You (D.& P. Everly)

5          Walk On (Dees, Orbison)

6          The Little Bell That Cried (G. Bua)

B Side

1          Bring It On Home (S. Cooke)

2          Something Happened To Me (Moorehouse, Rees, Nandelli)

3          Take Me To Tomorrow (Denver)

4          Treat Her Like A Lady (Crewe, Knight)

5          Brand New Woman (Crick-Feather)

6          Tomorrow Is Another Day (Ford)

7          Hawaii (B. Wilson)

Credits

·    Artwork – Des Bovey

·    Photography – Barry Clothier

·    Recording Engineer – Peter Hitchcock

·    Produced by Howard Gable

·    Recorded at HMV Studios – Wellington, New Zealand

The Simple Image, - The Little Bell That Cried

Label: His Master's Voice - HR332

Vinyl 7" Single

A Side             The Little Bell That Cried (Gene Bua)

B Side             I Wanna Go To Heaven (Flowerdew)

Credits

·    Recording Engineer – Peter Hitchcock

·    Produced by Howard Gable

·    Recorded at HMV Studios – Wellington, New Zealand

Simple Image, The – Hold Me Tight

Label: His Master's Voice (NZ) Limited - HR338

Vinyl 7" Single

A Side             Hold MeTight

B Side             Tomorrow Is Another Day

Credits

·    Recording Engineer – Peter Hitchcock

·    Produced by Howard Gable

·    Recorded at HMV Studios – Wellington, New Zealand

Zoot – One Times Two Times Three Times  Four

(Beeb Birtles, Darryl Cotton, Rick Brewer, Rick Springfield)

Label: Columbia – DO8605

Vinyl 7", Single

A Side             One Times, Two Times, Three Times, Four (Britten)

B Side             Sailing (Britten)

Credits

·    Recording Engineer – Roger Savage

·    Produced by Howard Gable

·    Recorded at Armstrongs Studios, Melbourne, Australia

Mr Lee Grant – Mr Lee In London

Label: His Master's Voice – CSDM6268

Vinyl LP Stereo

 A Side

1          Tabatha Twitchit

2          To Make A Big Man Cry

3          Stop In The Name Of Love

4          Walkin' With My Angel

5          Maria

6          Why Or Where Or When

B Side

1          You Don't Have To Say You Love Me

2          Big Man

3          The Wanderer

4          Tossin' And Turnin'

5          Do You Mind

6          Big Boots

Credits

·    Photography – Sal Criscillo

·    Recording Engineer – Peter Hitchcock

·    Produced by Howard Gable

·    Recorded at HMV Studios – Wellington, New Zealand

Mr. Lee Grant – Bless You

Label : His Master's Voice – HR322

Vinyl 7" Single

A Side             Bless You (Mann-Weil)          2:07

                        Arranged by  – Jimmy Sloggett

B Side             The Wanderer (Marasco)

                        Arranged by  – Garth Young

Credits

·    Recording Engineer – Peter Hitchcock

·    Produced by Howard Gable

·    Recorded at HMV Studios – Wellington, New Zealand

Mr. Lee Grant – The River Runs Dry

Label: His Master's Voice – HR314

Vinyl 7" Single

A Side             The River Runs Dry

                        Arranged by - Jimmy Sloggett           2:07

B Side                         Walking With My Angel (Goffin-King)

                        Arranaged by - Garth Young              2:07

Credits

·    Recording Engineer – Peter Hitchcock

·    Produced by Howard Gable

·    Recorded at HMV Studios – Wellington, New Zealand

Mr. Lee Grant - Movin' Away

Label: His Master's Voice - HR304

Vinyl 7" Single

A Side             Movin' Away (Wackett, Lynch)

                        Backing Vocals – The Gaynotes, The Lost Souls

B Side             Lovers Are Always The Same (Cara, Spencer)

Credits

·    Arranger - Garth Young

·    Recording Engineer – Peter Hitchcock

·    Produced by Howard Gable

·    Recorded at HMV Studios – Wellington, New Zealand

Mr. Lee Grant - Why Or Where Or When

Label: His Master's Voice - HR310

Vinyl 7" Single

A Side             Why Or Where Or When (Dunstall, Hill)

                        Arranger - Don Richardson

B Side             Hava Nagila (Traditional)

                        Arranger - Garth Young

Credits

·    Recording Engineer – Peter Hitchcock

·    Produced by Howard Gable

·    Recorded at HMV Studios – Wellington, New Zealand

The Twilights, – Lotus

Members:

Glenn Shorrock, John Bywaters, Laurie Pryor (2), Paddy McCartney, Peter Brideoake, Terry Britten

Label: Columbia – DO8602

Vinyl 7" Single

A Side             Lotus  (Terry Britten)                                     2:48

B Side             Sand In The Sandwiches (Terry Britten)       2:10

Credits

·    Recording Engineer – Roger Savage

·    Produced by Howard Gable

·    Recorded at Armstrongs Studios, Melbourne, Australia

Nick Nicholson And The Neketini Brass – Neketini Brass

Label: His Master's Voice (NZ) Limited - CSDM 6264

Vinyl LP Stereo

A Side

1          Mehe Manuhere

2          Haere Mai

3          Tekau Wai Wai Riki

4          Karu

5          Te Haere Ki Te Taone-O-Ata

6          Tararua Tramp

B Side

1          Hoki Hoki Tonu Mai

2          Neketini Mambo

3          Hine E Hine

4          Hoki Mai Ki Au

5          Pokarekare Ana

6          Po Ata Rau

Credits

·    Design, Photography – Sal Criscillo

·    Produced by Howard Gable

·    Recording Engineer – Peter Hitchcock

·    Recorded at HMV Studios – Wellington, New Zealand

Quincy Conserve - I'm So Proud

Label: His Master's Voice - HR325

Vinyl 7" Single

A Side                         I'm So Proud

B Side             I've Been Lovin' You Baby

Credits

·    Bass – Dave Orams

·    Drums – Raice McLeod

·    Keyboards – Rufus Rehu

·    Vocals, Guitar – Malcolm Hayman

·    Recording Engineer – Peter Hitchcock

·    Produced by Howard Gable

·    Recorded at HMV Studios – Wellington, New Zealand

Allison Durbin – I Have Loved Me A Man

Label: His Master's Voice – HR328

Vinyl 7" Single

A Side             I Have Loved Me A Man (Janice Weaver)

B Side             Sand - and Mike Parkinson (Lee Hazlewood)

Credits

·    Arranged by - Wayne Senior

·    Engineer – Peter ''Knobs'' Hitchcock

·    Produced by Howard Gable

·    Recorded at HMV Studios – Wellington, New Zealand

·     and Stebbing Studios – Auckland, New Zealand

Allison Durbin – Don't Come Any Closer

Label: His Master's Voice (NZ) Limited - HR333

Vinyl 7" Single

A Side             Don't Come Any Closer (C. Blackwell)

B Side             One More Tear (Bob Crewe, Hutch Davie)

Credits

·    Arranged by – Don Richardson

·    Engineer – Peter Hitchcock

·    Produced by Howard Gable

·     Recorded at HMV Studios – Wellington, New Zealand

Allison Durbin – Games People Play

Label: His Master's Voice (NZ) Limited - HR344

Vinyl 7" Single

A Side             Games People Play

B Side 1          You've Lost That Lovin' Feeling

B Side 2          Soul And Inspiration

Credits

·    Arranged by – Don Richardson

·    Engineer – Peter Hitchcock

·    Produced by Howard Gable

·     Recorded at HMV Studios – Wellington, New Zealand

Allison Durbin – I Have Loved Me A Man

Label: Decca  SKL-R 4996

Vinyl LP Stereo

A Side

1                      I Have Loved Me A Man (Weaver)

2                      River Deep Mountain High (Spector, Greenwich & Barry)

3                      Working On A Groovy Thing (Sedaka, Atkins)

4                      Morning Dew (Dobson, Rose)

5                      Something's Gotten Hold Of My Heart (Cook-Greenaway)

6                      Don't Come Any Closer (Blackwell)

B Side

1                      A Woman Needs Love (Smith, Hill)

2                      This Is My Song (Chaplin)

3                      This Girl's In Love (Bacharach, David)

4                      One More Tear (Crewe, Davie)

5                      Angel Of The Morning (Taylor)

6                      Sha-La-La-La-Lee (Lynch, Shuman)

Credits

·    Arranged by - Garth Young

·    Photography – John Buckley

·    Engineer – Peter Hitchcock

·    Produced by Howard Gable

·     Recorded at HMV Studios – Wellington, New Zealand

Fourmyula – Come With Me

Label: His Master's Voice - HR331

Vinyl 7" Single

A Side             Come With Me

B Side             Honey Chile

Credits

·    Recording Engineer – Peter Hitchcock

·    Produced by Howard Gable

·    Recorded at HMV Studios – Wellington, New Zealand

Fourmyula - Alice Is There

Label: His Master's Voice - HR334

Vinyl 7" Single

A Side                         Alice Is There (Richardson, Mason)

B Side             I Dig Your Act (L. Harper, Richard Poindexter, Robert Poindexter)

Credits

·    Recording Engineer – Peter Hitchcock

·    Produced by Howard Gable

·    Recorded at HMV Studios – Wellington, New Zealand

Fourmyula – The Fourmyula

Ali Richardson, Carl Evenson, Chris Parry, Martin Hope, Wayne Mason

Label: His Master's Voice – CSDM6283

Vinyl LP Stereo

Front Side

1          The Dodo Song  (Mason)

2          Alice Is There  (Richardson, Mason)

3          I Can Show You  (Lynton)

4          Mr. Whippy (Richardson, Mason)

5          Just Round The Corner (Richardson, Mason)

6          Toffee Apple Sunday (Reed, Thorburn)

7          Have You Heard The News (Richardson, Mason)

Back Side

1          Try Me (Simmons McAllister Vail)

2          Go Now (Felder, Keith)

3          As Long As I Got You (Barge, Lee)

4          Hitch It To The Horse (James)

5          Watcha Gonna Do (Dixon)

6          Something You've Got (Kenner)

7          Honey Chile (Maurie, Moy)

Credits

·    Photography – Barry ''Snap'' Clothier

·    Artwork – Lyn ''Brushes'' Bergquist

·    Engineer – Peter ''Knobs'' Hitchcock

·    Produced by Howard Gable

·    Recorded at HMV Studios – Wellington, New Zealand

Fourmyula – Green B Holiday

Ali Richardson, Carl Evenson, Chris Parry, Martin Hope, Wayne Mason

Label: His Master's Voice

Vinyl LP Stereo

A Side

1          Green 'B' Holiday

2          Mr Harris Garage

3          Dedicated To Mr Cook

4          Bang On Harry

5          Hampden Tennis Club

6          My Mama George

B Side

1          Mummy Told Me

2          Fortune

3          Cosy Picture Theatre

4          Sally's Line

5          Fun

6          Home

Credits

·    Engineer – Peter ''Knobs'' Hitchcock

·    Orchestral Arrangements by Don Richardson

·    Produced by Howard Gable

·     Recorded at HMV Studios – Wellington, New Zealand

1969

Fourmyula – Home

Label: His Master's Voice (NZ) Limited - HR 342

Vinyl 7" Single

A Side             Home (Mason, Richardson)

B Side             Tell Me No Lies (Mason, (Richardson)

Credits

·    Engineer – Peter ''Knobs'' Hitchcock

·    Produced by Howard Gable

·     Recorded at HMV Studios – Wellington, New Zealand

Johnny Farnham - One / Mr Whippy

Label: EMI Columbia - DO-8827

Vinyl 7" Single 45 RPM

A Side             One (Harry Nilsson)               2:43

B Side             Mr Whippy (Ali Richardson, Wayne Mason)

Credits

·    Arranged by John Hawker

·    Engineer – Roger Savage

·    Produced by Howard Gable

·    Recorded at Armstrongs Studios, Melbourne, Australia

Johnny Farnham - Raindrops Keep Fallin' On My Head

Label: ColumbJia - DO-8965

Vinyl, 7" Single 45 RPM

A Side             Raindrops Keep Fallin' On My Head ( Bacharach - David)              2:30

B Side             Two (Farnham)

Credits

·    Arranged by Peter Jones

·    Engineer – Roger Savage

·    Produced by Howard Gable

·    Recorded at Armstrongs Studios, Melbourne, Australia

Johnny Farnham - Comic Conversation

Label: EMI Columbia -DO-9234

Vinyl 7" Single 45 RPM

A Side             Comic Conversation (John Bromley)            3:20

B Side             Pretty Things (Johnny Farnham)

Credits

·    Arranged by Geoff Hales

·    Engineer – Roger Savage, Ern Rose

·    Produced by Howard Gable

·    Recorded at Armstrongs Studios, Melbourne, Australia

Johnny Farnham - I Saw Mommy Kissing Santa Claus

Label : EMI Columbia - DO-8604

Vinyl 7" Single 45 RPM

A Side             I Saw Mommy Kissing Santa Claus (Tommie Connor)        2:03

B Side             The Little Boy That Santa Claus Forgot (Leach, Carr, Connor)

Credits

·    Arranged by Geoff Hales

·    Engineer – Roger Savage, Ern Rose

·    Produced by Howard Gable

·    Recorded at Armstrongs Studios, Melbourne, Australia

The Master's Apprentices - Linda Linda

Label: Columbia – DO-8677

Vinyl 7" 45 RPM Single

A Side             Linda Linda (Ford, Keays)

B Side             Merry Go Round (Ford, Keays)

Credits

·    Recording Engineer – John Sayers

·    Produced by Howard Gable

·     Recorded at Armstrongs Studios, Melbourne, Australia

The Master's Apprentices - 5.10 Man

Label: Columbia - DO-8826

Vinyl 7" 45 RPM Single

A                     5.10 Man (Ford, Keays)                     2:18

B                     How I Love You (Ford, Keays)

Credits

·    Recording Engineer – Ern Rose

·    Produced by Howard Gable

·     Recorded at Armstrongs Studios, Melbourne, Australia

Master's Apprentices, The – Turn Up Your Radio

Label: Columbia – DO-9104

Vinyl 7" 45 RPM Single

A Side             Turn Up Your Radio ( Ford, Keays)               3:32

B Side             Jam It Up (Burgess, Ford, Wheatley, Keays)

Credits

·    Recording Engineer – John Sayers

·    Produced by Howard Gable

·     Recorded at Armstrongs Studios, Melbourne, Australia

The Musick Express - Jackie's Thing

Label: Columbia – DO-9242

Vinyl 7" Single

A Side             Jackie's Thing (Trevor McNamara)   3:20

B Side             How Does Paternity Suit You             2:40

Credits

·    Recording Engineer – Ern Rose

·    Produced by Howard Gable

·    Recorded at Armstrongs Studios, Melbourne, Australia

Allison Durbin - Golden Days 

Label : EMI Columbia - DO-9077

Vinyl 7" Single 45 RPM

A Side                         Golden Days (Goffin-King)

B Side             Make The Feeling Go Away   (Poor)

Credits

·    Arranged by Peter Jones

·    Engineer – Roger Savage, Ern Rose

·    Produced by Howard Gable

·    Recorded at Armstrongs Studios, Melbourne, Australia

Allison Durbin – Soft & Soulful

Label: His Master's Voice - CSDM 6323

Vinyl LP Stereo

A Side

1          Letter To Bill

2          Didn't We

3          A Man & A Woman

4          Loneliness Remembers What Happiness Forgets

5          This Is The First Time

6          Change Of Heart

7          Tonight I'll Say A Prayer

B Side

1          Holy Man

2          Watch Out Love

3          Just Ain't No Love

4          Tra La La La La

5          When I'm Gone

6          Am I The Same Girl

7          Heaven

Credits

·    Photography By - Mary Thompson

·    Recording Engineers – Ern Rose, John Sayers, Roger Savage

·    Produced by Howard Gable

·    Recorded at Armstrongs Studios, Melbourne, Australia

Johnny Farnham and Allison Durbin – Together

Label: His Master's Voice – OCSD 7682

Vinyl LP Album Stereo

A Side

1          Baby, Without You                             2:22

2          The Green Green Grass Is Dying

3          You're Alright With Me

4          Stay Awhile

5          I Don't Mind The Rain

6          Singing Our Song

B Side

1          That's Old Fashioned                          3:08

2          Come On Round To My Place

3          Ain't Nothing Like The Real Thing

4          Nobody Knows

5          Better Put Your Love Away

6          Get Together

Credits

·    Engineer – Roger Savage

·    Produced by Howard Gable

·    Recorded at Armstrongs Studios, Melbourne, Australia

The Groove – Relax Me

Label: EMI Columbia DO 8658

Vinyl 7" Single

A Side             Relax Me

B Side             Dance To The Music

Credits

·    Engineer – John Sayers

·    Produced by Howard Gable

·     Recorded at Armstrongs Studios, Melbourne, Australia

ZOOT – "1x2x3x4"

Label: EMI Columbia DO 8605

Vinyl 7" Single

A Side             "1x2x3x4"

B Side             Sailing

Credits

·    Engineer – Roger Savage

·    Produced by Howard Gable

·     Recorded at Armstrongs Studios, Melbourne, Australia

ZOOT –  It's About Time

Label: EMI Columbia DO 8930

Vinyl 7" Single

A Side             It's About Time

B Side             Sha Laa Laa

Credits

·    Engineer – Roger Savage

·    Produced by Howard Gable

·     Recorded at Armstrongs Studios, Melbourne, Australia

1970

ZOOT –  Hey Pinky

Label: EMI Columbia DO 9169

Vinyl 7" Single

A Side             Hey Pinky

B Side             Strange Things

Credits

·    Engineer – John Sayers

·    Produced by Howard Gable

·     Recorded at Armstrongs Studios, Melbourne, Australia

ZOOT –   Eleanor Rigby

Label: EMI Columbia DO 9317

Vinyl 7" Single

A Side             Eleanor Rigby

B Side             Turn Your Head

Credits

·    Engineer – John Sayers, Ern Rose

·    Produced by Howard Gable

·     Recorded at Armstrongs Studios, Melbourne, Australia

ZOOT –    Evil Child

Label: EMI Columbia DO 9434

Vinyl 7" Single

A Side             Evil Child

B Side              The Freak

Credits

·    Engineer – John Sayers

·    Produced by Howard Gable

·     Recorded at Armstrongs Studios, Melbourne, Australia

ZOOT - Just Zoot

Label: Columbia SCXO-7916

Vinyl LP Stereo

Side A

1          It's About Time (Brian Cadd-Don Mudie)

2          Feelings

3          Flying (Springfield)

4          Hey Mr Songwriter (Springfield)

5          Monty & Me (Poulsen-Woodley)

6          1 x 2 x 3 x 4 (Britten)

Side B

1          Sailing (Britten)

2          Sha La La (Springfield)

3          Shake a Feather

4          She's Alright (Britten)

5          Who's Afraid of You

6          Yes I'm Glad (Britten)

Allison Durbin - Don't Make Me Give In

Label: EMI Columbia - DNZ 121

Vinyl 7" Single

A Side             Don't Make Me Give In (Young)

B Side             World Of Music

Credits

·    Arranged by Peter Jones

·    Engineer – John Sayers, Ern Rose

·    Produced by Howard Gable

·    Recorded at Armstrongs Studios, Melbourne, Australia

Allison Durbin – He's Bad Bad Bad

Label: EMI Columbia – DNZ 119

Vinyl 7" Single

A Side             He's Bad Bad Bad

B Side             Am I The Same Girl

Credits

·    Arranged by John Farrar

·    Engineer – John Sayers

·    Produced by Howard Gable

·    Recorded at Armstrongs Studios, Melbourne, Australia

Johnny Farnham – Looking Through A Tear

Label: EMI Columbia – SCXO-7920

Vinyl LP Stereo

A Side

1          One ( Harry Nilsson)                                                                          2:49

2          I've Been Rained On (Dallas Frazier)                                                2:22

3          Mirror Of My Mind (Douglas, Flynn)                                               2:15

4          The World Goes Round And Round (M. Kunze, R. Siegel Jr.)         3:55

5          All Night Girl (B. Mason, L. Stirling, S. Whittingham)                   2:06

6          You're Breaking Me Up (Roy Wood)                                                2:28

7          Two (Johnny Farnham)                                                                     2:29

B Side

1          Raindrops Keep Fallin' On My Head (Burt Bacharach, Hal David) 4:42

2          Looking Through A Tear (A. Resnick, B. Scott)                              3:40

3          Visions Of Sugarplums (G. Campbell, J. Fuller)                             2:12

4          What Can I Do (Johnny Farnham)                                                    2:43

5          In A Moment Of Madness (J. McHugh, R. Freed)                            2:48

6          Ain't Society Great (Bobby Russell)                                                2:34

7          1432 Franklin Pike Circle Hero (Bobby Russell)                             3:58

Credits

·     Artwork By – Andrew Bokor

·     Photography – Rod Vickers

·     Engineer – Roger Savage, John Sayers, Ern Rose

·     Produced by Howard Gable

·     Recorded at Armstrongs Studios, Melbourne, Australia

Zoot  – Hey Pinky

Label: Columbia – DO-9169

Vinyl, 7" 45 RPM

A Side             Hey Pinky (R.Springfield)                 3:50

B Side             Strange Things (R.Springfield)          3:30

Credits

·     Engineer – John Sayers, Ern Rose

·     Produced by Howard Gable

·     Recorded at Armstrongs Studios, Melbourne, Australia

Zoot – Eleanor Rigby

Label: Columbia – DO-9317

Vinyl 7" 45 RPM Single

A                     Eleanor Rigby (Lennon-McCartney)             4:39

B                     Turn Your Head (Rick Springfield)                4:54

Credits

·     Engineer – John Sayers, Ern Rose

·     Produced by Howard Gable

·     Recorded at Armstrongs Studios, Melbourne, Australia

Russell Morris – Rachel

Label: EMI Columbia – DO- 9102

Vinyl 7" 45 RPM

A Side             Rachel (R.Foggart)

B Side             Slow Joey (Morris)

Credits

·     Engineer – John Sayers, Ern Rose

·     Produced by Howard Gable

·     Recorded at Armstrongs Studios, Melbourne, Australia

Russell Morris – Mr. America

Label: EMI Columbia – DO-9314

Vinyl 7" 45 RPM

A Side             Mr. America (Morris)            3:43

B Side             Stand Together (Morris)

Credits

·     Engineer – John Sayers, Ern Rose

·     Produced by Howard Gable

·     Recorded at Armstrongs Studios, Melbourne, Australia

Russell Morris – Sweet Sweet Love

Label: HMV – EA-9539

Vinyl 7" 45 RPM

A Side             Sweet Sweet Love (Morris)

B Side             Jail Jonas Daughter (Morris)

Credits

·     Engineer – John French

·     Produced by Howard Gable

·     Recorded at TCS Studios, Melbourne, Australia

Yvonne Barrett - LU

Label:  Columbia DO-9062

Vinyl 7” 45 RPM

A Side "Lu" (Laura Nyro)

B Side "Picture Me Gone"

·     Arranged by John Farrar

·     Engineer – John Sayers

·     Produced by Howard Gable

·     Recorded at Armstrongs Studios, Melbourne, Australia

1971

Russell Morris – Bloodstone

Label: EMI – OCSD 7679

Vinyl LP Stereo

A Side

1          O Helley (Morris)

2          Jail Johan's Daughter (Morris)

3          Saints And Sinners (Morris)

4          Our Hero Is Dead (Morris)

5          Heaven Shines  (Morris)

B Side

1          The Cell (Morris)

2          The Gambler's Lament (Morris)

3          Goodbye (Morris)

4          Ride Your Chariot (Morris)

5          Lay In The Graveyard (Morris)

6          Sweet Sweet Love (Morris)

Credits

·    Guitars – Phil Manning, Rick Springfield

·    Harmonica – Matt Taylor

·    Piano – Brian Cadd, Warren Morgan, Ian Mason, Peter Jones

·    Bass – Barry Sullivan, Mike Clarke, Bob Arrowsmith

·    Drums – Barry Harvey, Mark Kennedy

·    Engineers – John French, John Sayers

·    Produced by Howard Gable

·    Recorded at Armstrongs Studios, Melbourne, Australia

·    and TCS Studios, Melbourne, Australia

Russell Morris – Live With Friends

Label: HMV – EA-9824

Vinyl 7" 45 RPM

A Side             Live With Friends (Morris-Cadd)

B Side             Alcohol Farm (Morris)

Credits

·     Engineer – John French

·     Produced by Howard Gable

·     Recorded at TCS Studios, Melbourne, Australia

Spectrum  – I'll Be Gone

Label: Harvest – HAR-9329

Vinyl 7" Single

A Side             I'll Be Gone (Rudd)                                                    3:28

B Side             Launching Place, Part II (Rudd)

Credits

·     Engineer – John Sayers

·     Produced by Howard Gable

·     Recorded at Armstrongs Studios, Melbourne, Australia

ZOOT - Zoot Out

Label: Columbia SOEX 9842

Vinyl LP Stereo

Side A

1          Eleanor Rigby (Lennon-McCartney)

2          Evil Child (Springfield)

3          Flying (Springfield)

4          The Freak (Springfield)

5          Hey Pinky (Springfield)

6          Monty & Me (Hans Poulsen-Bruce Woodley)

Side B

1          It's About Time (Brian Cadd-Don Mudie)

2          Mr Songwriter (Springfield)

3          1 x 2 x 3 x 4 (Terry Britten)

4          Strange Things (Springfield)

5          Turn Your Head (Springfield)

6          You Better Get Going Now (Jackie Lomax)

Credits

·     Engineer – John Sayers, Roger Savage, Ern Rose

·     Produced by Howard Gable

·     Produced by Ian Meldrum (side A, track 6)

·     Recorded at Armstrongs Studios, Melbourne, Australia

Spectrum  – Spectrum Part One

Label: Harvest – SHVL 601

Vinyl LP Stereo

 ASide

1          Make Your Stash (Ross Wilson)                                              4:08

2          Fiddling Fool (Mike Rudd)                                                    12:32

B Side

1          Super Body (Mike Rudd)                                                         9:11

2          Drifting (Mike Rudd)                                                               3:24

3          Mumbles I Wonder Why (Mike Rudd, Ross Hanaford)          5:56

Credits

·    Guitar, Vocals, Recorder, harmonica – Michael Rudd

·    Bass – Bill Putt

·    Drums, Percussion – Mark Kennedy

·    Organ, Piano, Vocals – Lee Neale

·    Black & White Photography By  – Chris Watt

·    Layout, Colour Photography By  – Michael Rudd

·    Engineer – John Sayers

·    Producer – Howard Gable

·    Recorded at Armstrongs Studios, Melbourne, Australia

Spectrum  – Milesago

Label: Harvest – SHDW 50/51-D, EMI – SHDW 50/51-D

2 × Vinyl LP Stereo

Side 1

1          But That's All Right                                                   4:20

2          Love's My Bag                                                           4:14

3          Your Friend And Mine                                               7:22

4          Untitled                                                                       4:30

Side 2

1          Play A Song That I Know                                           3:45

2          What The World Needs (Is A New Pair Of Socks)    7:30

3          Virgin's Tale                                                               3:30

4          A Fate Worse Than Death                                          4:42

5          Tell Me Why                                                              1:47

Side 3

            The Sideways Saga

1a        The Question                                                              1:06

1b        The Answer                                                                 2:14

1c        Do The Crab                                                               4:55

1d        Everybody's Walking Sideways                                 2:42

2          Trust Me                                                                     6:05

3          Don't Bother Coming Round                                      3:23

Side 4

1          Fly Without Its Wings                                                10:07

2          Mama, Did Jesus Wear Make Up?                             2:10

3          Milesago                                                                     7:14

Credits

·    Vocals, Guitar, Recorder – Michael Rudd

·    Bass – Bill Putt

·    Drums, Percussion, Vocals – Ray Arnott

·    Piano, Keyboards, Vocals – Lee Neale

·    Engineer – John Sayers

·    Producer – Howard Gable

·    Recorded at Armstrongs Studios, Melbourne, Australia

Sherbet – You've Got The Gun

Label: Infinity – K-6570

Vinyl 7" Single

A Side             You've Got The Gun

B Side             Rock Me Gently

Credits

·     Engineer – John French

·     Produced by Howard Gable

·     Recorded at TCS Studios, Melbourne, Australia

La De Das, The – Gonna See My Baby Tonight

Label: His Master's Voice – EA-9638

Vinyl 7" Single

A Side             Gonna See My Baby Tonight  (Borich)

B Side                         Fare Thee Well (Roberts, Key)

Credits

·     Engineer – John French

·     Produced by Howard Gable

·     Recorded at TCS Studios, Melbourne, Australia

 1972

Blackfeather – Boppin' The Blues

Label: Infinity – INL 34731

Vinyl LP Album

A Side

1          Pineapple                    3:58

2          Gee Willikers             6:45

3          Own Way Of Living   8:03

4          Red Head Rag            6:29

B Side

1          Mama Roll                  5:01

2          Get It On                     3:00

3          Boppin' The Blues      6:34

4          Lay Down Lady          5:58

Credits

·    Recorded At – Melbourne Town Hall

·    Recorded At – Kew Club

·    Remixed At – T.C.S. Studios

·    Produced by Howard Gable

Dennis Garcia – Jive To Stay Alive

Label: Indigo  – DG/IN 001

Vinyl LP Album Gatefold

A Side

1          Crystal Balls                                                   3:35

2          Electrons, Neutrons, Protons & Morons        2:02

3          You Can Be Anything                                     4:38

4          Moroccan Roll                                                3:23

B Side

1          Door To Dimension 4                                     4:14

2          If You Wanna Dance                                       3:44

3          Don't Lay Your Trip On Me                           3:20

4          I.B.M. Boogie                                                 3:59

Credits

·    All Compositions by Dennis Garcia

·    Synthsizer sequencing and Computer programming by Dennis Garcia

·    Engineers – Graham Owens, John French

·    Producer Howard Gable

·     Recorded at TCS Studios, Melbourne, Australia

CARSON

"Boogie, Part I" / "Boogie, Part II"

EMI Harvest HAR-9965

Vinyl 7” Single

Credits

·    Engineer – John French

·    Producer – Howard Gable

·     Recorded at TCS Studios, Melbourne, Australia

1973

Allison Durbin – Three Times A Lady

Label: Hammard – HAM 033

Vinyl LP Stereo

A Side

1                      Silver Threads And Golden Needles

2                      Here You Come Again

3                      Harper Valley P.T.A.

4                      It's A Heartache

5                      We'll Sing In The Sunshine

6                      Thank God I'm A Country Girl

7                      Queen Of The House

8                      Rose Garden

B Side

1                      A Little Bit More

2                      Don't It Make My Brown Eyes Blue

3                      Help Me Make It Through The Night

4                      Blue Bayou

5                      I Don't Want To Play House

6a                    Sometimes When We Touch

6b                    Three Times A Lady

7                      How Deep Is Your Love

8                      You Light Up My Life

Credits

·    Arranged By – Peter Sullivan

·    Design – Peter Ewers & Associates

·    Engineer – John French

·    Producer – Howard Gable

·    Recorded at TCS Studios, Melbourne, Australia

Allison Durbin – Bright Eyes

Label: Hammard – HAM 043

Vinyl LP Stereo

A Side

1          Lotta Love

2          Sharing The Night Together

3          If I Said You Had A Beautiful Body Would You Hold It Against Me

4          Some Girls

5          Darlin'

6          Sweet Dream People

7          You Make Me Feel Like Dancin'

B Side

1          Bright Eyes

2          My Eyes Adored You

3          Behind Closed Doors

4          You Needed Me

5a        You Are So Beautiful

5b        When I Need You

6          On The Inside

7          Lost In Love

Credits

·    Arranged By – Peter Sullivan

·    Design – Peter Ewers & Associates

·    Engineer – John French

·    Producer – Howard Gable

·     Recorded at TCS Studios, Melbourne, Australia

1974

Kush (16) – Presents Snow White... And The Eight Straights

Label: Warner Bros. Records – 600,007

Vinyl LP Stereo

A Side

1                      Wait Overture (Herzog, Duff)

2                      Easy Street (Steve Ball)

3                      All Right In The City (Dunn, McCashen)

4                      McArthur Park (Jim Webb)

5                      Wait (Herzog, Duff)

B Side

1                      Satanic Deity (Herzog, Duff)

2                      Christopher John (Herzog)

3                      Klue (Herzog, Duff)

Credits

·    Alto Saxophone, Baritone Saxophone – John Ellis

·    Arranged By – Kush

·    Backing Vocals – Cookies, The  (tracks: A5)

·    Bass – Rob Matthews

·    Cover, Artwork – Timotheous Fiske

·    Drums – Nick Lister

·    Flute – Ron Anderson (tracks: B2)

·    Guitar – David Herzog

·    Keyboards – Steve Ball

·    Percussion, Lead Vocals – Geoff Duff

·    Photography By – Franz Scharwenka

·    Tenor Saxophone, Flute – Bill Harrower

·    Trumpet – Ian Hellings, John Santos (4)

·    Engineers – Ian McKenzie, Roger Savage, Ross Cockle

·    Producer – Howard Gable

·    Recorded at Armstrongs Studios, Melbourne, Australia

Allison Durbin – Are You Lonesome Tonight

Label: Hammard – HAM 017

Vinyl LP Stereo Gatefold

A Side

A1                   Love Letters  ( Hayman, Young)

A2                   Go Away Little Girl (Goffin/King)

A3                   Crying In The Rain (King, Greenfield)

A4                   I'm Sorry (Allbritten, Self)

A5                   Make The World Go Away (Cochran)

A6                   The Rhythm Of The Rain (Gummoe)

A7                   The End Of The World (Kent, Bee)

A8                   They Remind Me Too Much Of You (Robertson)

B Side

B1                   Blue On Blue (David/Bacharach)

B2                   She'll Have To Go (J & A Allison)

B3                   It's All In The Game (Sigman, Dawes)

B4                   Are You Lonesome Tonight (Handman, Turk)

B5                   All Alone Am I (Altman, Hadjidakis)

B6                   If You Leave Me Now (P. Cetera)

B7                   The Way We Were (M. Hamlisch)

B8                   Dream Lover (Bobby Darin)

Credits

·    Arranged By – Douggie Reece (tracks: A3, A5, A7, A8, B4, B5, B7, B8),

Peter Jones  (tracks: A1, A2, B3, B6), Peter Sullivan  (tracks: A4, A6, B1, B2)

·    Engineers – Graham Owens, Tony Buettel

·    Producer – Howard Gable

·    Recorded at TCS Studios, Melbourne, Australia

Sally Boyden – The Littlest Australian

Label: Hammard – HAM 008

Vinyl LP STEREO Gatefold

A Side

            Medley:

1a        Getting To Know You

1b        I Whistle A Happy Tune

1c        Spoonful Of Sugar

2          Happy Birthday Baby

3          Tan Shoes And Pink Shoe Laces

4          The Unicorn

5          Magic

6          One More Kiss

7          Nobody's Child

8          I'm Gonna Knock On Your Door

            Medley:

1a        Thumbellina

1b        I'm Late

1c        Teddy Bear's Picnic

1d        Bippity Boppity Boo

2          What A Wonderful World

3          Cruisin' Down The River

4          Mama

5          I'd Like To Teach The World To Sing

6          Four & Twenty Hours

7          My Mother's Eyes

8          The Lord's Prayer

Credits

·    Arranged By – Peter Sullivan

·    Engineers – Ian McKenzie, Roger Savage, Ross Cockle

·    Producer – Howard Gable

·    Recorded at Armstrongs Studios, Melbourne, Australia

1977

Sally Boyden – A Day In A Life

Label: Hammard – HAM 018

Vinyl LP Stereo Gatefold

A Side

1          Happy Birthday Sweet 16

2          Simon Says

3          Boom Sha La La Lo

4          Do You Want To Know A Secret

5          The Bare Necessities

6          Ob-La-Di Ob-La-Da

7          Mornington Ride

            Wizard Of Oz Medley:

8a        Ding Dong The Witch Is Dead

8b        Follow The Yellow Brick Road

8c        We're Off To See The Wizard

B Side

1          Zipa-Dee-Doo-Dah

2          Sing C'est La Vie

3          Talk To The Animals

4          Oom Pah Pah

5          Catch A Falling Star

6          Do Re Mi

7          The Candy Man

8          Imagine

Credits

·    Arranged By – Peter Sullivan

·    Engineers – Ian McKenzie, Roger Savage, Ross Cockle

·    Producer – Howard Gable

·    Recorded at Armstrongs Studios, Melbourne, Australia

 1978

Daly Wilson Big Band – Too Good For A One Night Stand

Label: Hammard – HAM 027

Vinyl LP Gatefold

A Side

1          Star Wars (Williams)                                                             3:40

            Arranged By – C. Hull

2          Charlie's Angels (Ferguson, Elliot)                                       3:31

            Arranged By – E. Wilson, W. Daly Organ Solo – Col Nolan

3          Lady Madonna (Lennon-McCartney)                                    3:27

            Arranged By – E. Wilson, W. Daly Guitar Solo – Mick Reid

4          Song For Sarah (Ed Wilson)                                                  3:10

            Arranged By – E. Wilson, W. Daly Guitar Solo – Mick Reid

            Saxophone Tenor, Solo – David Glyde

5          Car Wash (N. Whitfield)                                                        3:33

            Arranged By – E. Wilson, W. Daly

            Flute Solo – Doug Foskett,  Guitar Solo – Mick Reid

6          Gonna Fly Now (Rocky) (Robbins, Conti, Connors)            2:38

            Arranged By – E. Wilson, W. Daly, Guitar Solo – Mick Reid

B Side

1          Doctor Sunshine  ( Written-By – Hull, Wilson, Daly)          2:59

            Arranged By – E. Wilson, W. Daly

2          Baretta (Grusin, Ames)                                                          3:15

            Arranged By – C. Hull

3          Tribute To A Czar (Ed Wilson)                                              2:45

            Arranged By – E. Wilson, W. Daly

4          Timepiece ( C. Hull)                                                              2:45

            Arranged By - C. Hull

5          Carnival (D.C. Santana, T. Coster)

            Arranged By – E. Wilson, W. Daly

6          The Greatest Love Of All  (G. Goffin, M. Masser)

            Arranged By – E. Wilson, W. Daly

Credits

·     Alto Saxophone – Doug Foskett, Graeme Jesse

·     Baritone Saxophone – John Mitchell (9)

·     Bass – John Coca

·     Clarinet – David Glyde, Doug Foskett, Errol Buddle, Graeme Jesse, John Mitchell

·     Congas, Bongos, Performer [Chocola] – Barry Sutton

·     Drums, Timbales, Tambourine, Drums [Electric Syndrums], Bells [Bell Tree], Bells [Go-go], Performer [Match Tree] – Warren Daly

·     Flute – David Glyde, Doug Foskett, Errol Buddle, Graeme Jesse, John Mitchell

·     Flute [Alto] – Doug Foskett

·     Guitar – Mick Reid

·     Harp [Blues] – Greg Foster

·     Lyricon – Doug Foskett

·     Organ [Hammond] – Col Nolan

·     Piano, Electric Piano, Synthesizer [Strings], Clavinet – Charles Hull

·     Soprano Saxophone – David Glyde, Doug Foskett, Graeme Jesse

·     Tenor Saxophone – David Glyde, Errol Buddle

·     Trombone [Bass] – Steve Powell

·     Trombone [Tenor] – Ed Wilson, Steve Powell

·     Trumpet, Flugelhorn – Don Raverty, Miles Harris, Norm Harris

·     Engineer – Graham Owens

·     Producer – Howard Gable

·     Recorded at Trafalgar Studios, Sydney

 Tracks Produced By: Howard Gable

References

Year of birth missing (living people)
Living people
New Zealand record producers
New Zealand expatriates in Australia
Australian record producers